Wheaton is a surname. Notable people with the surname include:

Charles Augustus Wheaton, abolitionist
David Wheaton, professional tennis player, writer, speaker, talk-show host
Frank Wheaton, American Civil War general
Frank K. Wheaton, personal manager, agent and event producer
Henry Wheaton, theorist of international law, and third Reporter to the Supreme Court of the United States
James Wheaton, actor and director
Karen Wheaton, gospel singer
Loyd Wheaton, American general
Paul Wheaton, permaculture author
Wil Wheaton, writer, actor 
Will Wheaton, jazz musician
William Wheaton, baseball pioneer